Various definitions of economics have been proposed, including, "what economists do".  The earlier term for 'economics' was political 'economy'. It is adapted from the French Mercantilist usage of économie politique, which extended economy from the ancient Greek term for household management to the national realm as public administration of the affairs of state. Mister James Stuart (1767) wrote the first book in English with 'political economy' in the title, explaining that just as:
Economy in general [is] the art of providing for all the wants of a family, [so the science of political economy] seeks to secure a certain fund of subsistence for all the inhabitants, to obviate every circumstance which may render it precarious; to provide every thing necessary for supplying the wants of the society, and to employ the inhabitants ... in such manner as naturally to create reciprocal relations and dependencies between them, so as to supply one another with reciprocal wants.

The title page gave as its subject matter "population, agriculture, trade, industry, money, coins, interest, circulation, banks, exchange, public credit and taxes".

J.B. Say (1803), distinguishing the subject from its public-policy uses, defines it as the science of production, distribution, and consumption of wealth. On the satirical side, Thomas Carlyle (1849) coined 'the dismal science' as an epithet for classical economics, in this context, commonly linked to the pessimistic analysis of Malthus (1798). John Stuart Mill (1844) defines the subject in a social context as:
The science which traces the laws of such of the phenomena of society as arise from the combined operations of mankind for the production of wealth, in so far as those phenomena are not modified by the pursuit of any other object.

The shift from the social to the individual level appears within the main works of the Marginal Revolution. Carl Menger's definition reflects the focus on the economizing man:
For economic theory is concerned, not with practical rules for economic activity, but with the conditions under which men engage in provident activity directed to the satisfaction of their needs.

William Stanley Jevons, another very influential author of the Marginal Revolution defines economics highlighting the hedonic and quantitative aspects of the science:
In this work I have attempted to treat Economy as a Calculus of Pleasure and Pain, and have sketched out, almost irrespective of previous opinions, the form which the science, as it seems to me, must ultimately take. I have long thought that as it deals throughout with quantities, it must be a mathematical science in matter if not in language.

Marshall provides a still widely cited definition in his textbook Principles of Economics (1890) that extends analysis beyond wealth and from the societal to the microeconomic level, creating a certain synthesis of the views of those still more sympathetic with the classical political economy (with social wealth focus) and those early adopters of the views expressed in the Marginal Revolution (with individual needs focus).
Alfred Marshall's inclusion of the expression wellbeing was also very significant to the discussion on the nature of economics:
Political Economy or Economics is a study of mankind in the ordinary business of life; it examines that part of individual and social action which is most closely connected with the attainment and with the use of the material requisites of wellbeing. Thus it is on the one side a study of wealth; and on the other, and more important side, a part of the study of man.

Lionel Robbins (1932) developed implications of what has been termed "[p]erhaps the most commonly accepted current definition of the subject":
Economics is a science which studies human behaviour as a relationship between ends and scarce means which have alternative uses.

Robbins describes the definition as not classificatory in "pick[ing] out certain kinds of behaviour" but rather analytical in "focus[ing] attention on a particular aspect of behaviour, the form imposed by the influence of scarcity."

Some subsequent comments criticized the definition as overly broad in failing to limit its subject matter to analysis of markets. From the 1960s, however, such comments abated as the economic theory of maximizing behavior and rational-choice modeling expanded the domain of the subject to areas previously treated in other fields.  There are other criticisms as well, such as in scarcity not accounting for the macroeconomics of high unemployment.

Gary Becker, a contributor to the expansion of economics into new areas, describes the approach he favors as "combin[ing the] assumptions of maximizing behavior, stable preferences, and market equilibrium, used relentlessly and unflinchingly." One commentary characterizes the remark as making economics an approach rather than a subject matter but with great specificity as to the "choice process and the type of social interaction that [such] analysis involves."

John Neville Keynes regarded the discussion leading up to the definition of economics more important than the definition itself. It would be a way to reveal the scope, direction and troubles the science faces.

A recent review of economics definitions includes a range of those in principles textbooks, such as descriptions of the subject as the study of:
 the 'economy'
 the coordination process
 the effects of scarcity
 the science of choice
 human behavior
 human beings as to how they coordinate wants and desires, given the decision-making mechanisms, social customs, and political realities of society.
It concludes that the lack of agreement need not affect the subject-matter that the texts treat. Among economists more generally, it argues that a particular definition presented may reflect the direction toward which the author believes economics is evolving, or should evolve.

References

Further references
 Bye, Raymond T. (1939) "The Scope and Definition of Economics," Journal of Political Economy, 47(5), pp. 623–647.
 Coase, Ronald H. (1978). "Economics and Contiguous Disciplines," Journal of Legal Studies, 7(2), pp. 201–211.
 Dow, Sheila C. (2002) Economic Methodology: An Inquiry, Oxford University Press. Description and review.

History of economic thought
Philosophy of economics
Economics